Hanoisiella is a monotypic moth genus in the subfamily Arctiinae described by Joseph de Joannis in 1928. It contains the single species Hanoisiella exilicosta, which is found in China (Tonkin).

References

Lithosiini